Zapotillo Canton is a canton of Ecuador, located in the Loja Province.  Its capital is the town of Zapotillo.  Its population at the 2001 census was 10,940.

General information

Header Cantonal: Zapotillo

Elevation: 325 m.s.n.m

Average temperature: 26 °C

Area: 1238 Km2

Climate: Subtropical dry

Location: Southeast of the province of Loja

Limits:

North and South: Republic of Peru

East Puyango Canton, Pinal, and Macara Celica

West. Republic of Peru

Political Division:

1 urban parish, 5 rural parishes and 69  barrios

urban parish: Zapotillo

rural parishes: Mangahurco, Garzarreal, Lemons, Paletillas, and Bolaspamba

TRADITIONAL PARTY
 Cantonization August 27
 Religious celebration January 20

References

Cantons of Loja Province